The 2015–16 2. Bundesliga was the 42nd season of the 2. Bundesliga.

Teams

A total of 18 teams participated in the 2015–16 2. Bundesliga. These include 14 teams from the 2014–15 2. Bundesliga, together with SC Freiburg and SC Paderborn, who directly relegated from the 2014–15 Bundesliga, and Arminia Bielefeld and MSV Duisburg, who directly promoted from the 2014–15 3. Liga. The 16th-placed 2014–15 2. Bundesliga team, 1860 Munich, defeated the third-place finisher in the 2014–15 3. Liga, Holstein Kiel, in a two-legged play-off and avoided relegation.

Stadiums and locations

 The capacity is reduced to 42,959 spectators during the 2015-16 season, due to a redevelopment of various stadium areas. The redevelopment includes an expansion of the VIP area, the press box and the wheelchair spaces.

Personnel and kits

Managerial changes

League table

Results

Promotion play-offs

Relegation play-offs
The team which finished sixteenth faced the third-placed 2015–16 3. Liga side for a two-legged play-off. The winner on aggregate score after both matches earned entry into the 2016–17 2. Bundesliga.

First leg

Match rules:
 90 minutes.
 Seven named substitutes, of which up to three may be used.

Second leg

Match rules:
 90 minutes.
 30 minutes of extra time if tied on aggregate and away goals.
 Penalty shoot-out if no further goals are scored.
 Seven named substitutes, of which up to three may be used.

Würzburger Kickers won 4–1 on aggregate.

Player statistics

Top goalscorers

Top assists

Hat-tricks

4Player scored four goals

References

External links

2015–16 in German football leagues
2015-16
Germ